Return to Mysterious Island is a 2004 graphic adventure game developed by Kheops Studio and published by The Adventure Company. Based on Jules Verne's 1875 novel The Mysterious Island, the game casts the player as Mina, a shipwrecked woman forced to survive on an uncharted island.

Gameplay
Players explore the world by clicking on different areas to move and to interact with items. Players also have an inventory, in which they can collect and store items and construct new ones.

Plot
Return to Mysterious Island follows Mina, a strong young woman alone on a round-the-world sailing expedition. Caught in a tremendous storm, she becomes stranded on the shores of a wild and apparently uninhabited island. As she explores her new surroundings, she uncovers artifacts, living spaces and technologies left behind by the people who came before her to this uncharted island.

Creating a new life, Mina builds a home from the remains of the previous settlements and uses her survival skills against the wilds of the jungle. She soon becomes aware of a figure in the shadows who, seemingly aware of her troubles, offers her assistance. She eventually identifies this figure as the unsettled ghost of Captain Nemo, whose body is located in a cave on the island. Piecing together the hints and clues he provides, Mina must retrieve his body and give him a proper burial in order to free his tortured soul, and then travel to the Nautilus deep below the island shore to unlock a way to escape the island.

Development
Return to Mysterious Island was conceived by Kheops Studio because Mystery of the Nautilus had been a success for publisher DreamCatcher Interactive, selling 117,000 units globally by 2004.

Reception

According to the NPD Group, Return to Mysterious Island sold 21,700 copies at a list price $19.99 by June 2005. It became Kheops Studio's biggest hit worldwide, which company head Benoît Hozjan attributed to word of mouth. The game's later iPhone release sold 100,000 copies by November 2009. Review aggregation website Metacritic reported critical reception of Return to Mysterious Islands original computer release as "generally positive", based on 19 reviews.

The game 4 out of 5 from Modojo for its iPhone version; the reviewer said that the game have remarkable visuals and audio as well as manageable inventory system but have frustrating puzzles. Geek.com who also liked previously states pros but also compared it to Myst.

Return to Mysterious Island was nominated as SME's pick for the best adventure game of 2004, but lost the prize to Syberia II. In 2011, Adventure Gamers named Return to Mysterious Island the 53rd-best adventure game ever released.

Legacy
On November 25, 2008 Microïds, (Anuman Interactive's adventure games label) announced that a sequel was being made, Return to Mysterious Island II. Development by Kheops Studio began in April 2008, and the game was released on PC and Apple iPhone on August 14, 2009.

Coladia, founded in 2005, teamed up with Kheops Studio to update and port Mysterious Island and other Kheops adventure games to macOS and iOS. A port of the game to Apple's iPhone was released on the iTunes app store on June 15, 2009.

References

External links
Official Return to Mysterious Island Site
Return to Mysterious Island at Kheops Studio
Official Return to Mysterious Island Mac OS X Site 
Return to Mysterious Island at Microïds
 Return to Mysterious Island at MobyGames

2004 video games
Adventure games
Point-and-click adventure games
First-person adventure games
Video games developed in France
Video games set on islands
Windows Mobile Professional games
Video games based on works by Jules Verne
Video games featuring female protagonists
Survival video games
The Adventure Company games
Return to Mysterious Island (video game series)
Kheops Studio games
IOS games
MacOS games
Windows games
Works based on The Mysterious Island
Single-player video games